Kremenets Mountains is hill range in Volhynia in western Ukraine, being the extension to east of Voronyaki.

They are the northern border of Podolia Upland. The average height is around 300–400 m (1200 ft). The highest point is  Drabanykha (409 m/1342 ft).

References

Volhynia
Mountains of Ukraine